Temple Shalom of Northwest Arkansas is a small, mixed-denomination, volunteer-run congregation that serves as the focal point for Jewish life in the Fayetteville, Arkansas area. While Temple Shalom is an affiliate of the Union for Reform Judaism, as the only Jewish congregation in Fayetteville, Temple Shalom supports a variety of activities and services for Jews of all backgrounds.

Early history
On January 21, 1981 about 30 people attended a meeting in Fayetteville, Arkansas with Rabbi Lawrence Jackofsky of the Southwest Council, Union of American Hebrew Congregations of Dallas. An overwhelming majority of those present favored the establishment of a Jewish congregation. On February 23, 1981 the congregation was formed and named Temple Shalom.

In March 1981, Rabbi Norbert L. Rosenthal, emeritus rabbi of Temple Israel in Tulsa, Oklahoma was invited to serve as the first rabbi. At the consecration ceremony on April 25, 1981, the new board officers were installed. Temple Shalom arranged to use the Unitarian Universalist Fellowship hall for monthly services.  Weekly Religious School, organized and conducted by parent volunteers took place at the Sam Barg Hillel House at 607 Storer.

Building history
In 1999, the University of Arkansas Hillel began leasing a building from the University at 608 N. Storer Avenue in Fayetteville. Temple Shalom leased space in this larger building.  Larger gatherings continued to take place at the neighboring Unitarian Universalist Fellowship.  

In 2004, when Temple Shalom was growing out of that building, some members from the Rogers and Bentonville area decided to form a new congregation in Bentonville, Congregation Etz Chaim, temporarily easing the need for Temple Shalom to move again to a bigger facility.

By 2005, Temple Shalom had again grown enough to need its own building. The membership included nearly 60 families. There were about 30 children attending Religious School, several of whom became Bar and Bat Mitzvah each year. The project to acquire a building for Fayetteville's first synagogue was launched headed by the synagogue's president.  

In 2006, local builder, Fadil Bayyari, a Palestinian Muslim from Springdale, Arkansas proposed to build a new building for Temple Shalom at his cost, a savings of an estimated 20% of the total cost of the project, or $250,000. Mr. Bayyari's offer spurred much interest in the local and national press.

In 2007 Temple Shalom purchased a little less than an acre of land at the corner of Sang Avenue and Cleveland Street to create a combined Temple Shalom and University of Arkansas Hillel home and to house a multicultural library.

Clergy
Until 2006, Temple Shalom was served by a variety of visiting rabbis, student rabbis, and cantors, who made monthly visits to Fayetteville during the academic year. In 2006, University of Arkansas professor of philosophy Jacob Adler, having newly acquired his rabbinical ordination, became the first resident rabbi and he led the congregation into 2020.

References and notes

External links
templeshalomnwa.org/
 

Islamic and Jewish interfaith dialogue
Synagogues in Arkansas
Jewish organizations established in 1981
Reform synagogues in Arkansas
Student religious organizations in the United States
Buildings and structures in Fayetteville, Arkansas
1981 establishments in Arkansas